Galloping Romeo is a 1933 American pre-Code Western film released by Monogram Pictures, written and directed by Robert N. Bradbury, and starring Bob Steele.

Cast
Bob Steele as Bob Rivers
Doris Hill as Mary Kent
George "Gabby" Hayes as Grizzly
Ed Brady as Matt Kent
Frank Ball as Sheriff Jerry
Ernie Adams as Andy Kent
Lafe McKee as Marshal Gregory
Earl Dwire as Express Agent Pete Manning (replaced by Hal Price)
George Nash as Henchman
Silver Tip Baker as Stage Driver Silver Keller (uncredited)
Dick Dickinson as Henchman (uncredited)
Tex Palmer as Deputy (uncredited)
Hal Price as Pete Manning, Express Agent (uncredited)

See also
Bob Steele filmography

External links

1933 films
1933 Western (genre) films
1930s English-language films
American black-and-white films
Films directed by Robert N. Bradbury
Monogram Pictures films
American Western (genre) films
Films with screenplays by Harry L. Fraser
1930s American films